Carl Friedrich Pöppelmann (1697–1750) was an 18th-century Saxon architect and son of Matthäus Daniel Pöppelmann.

Works
His works included:
 Warsaw Castle
 Ujazdów Castle, Warsaw
 New Grodno Castle, Belarus
 The Saxon Gardens, Warsaw
 Piaseczno Church, Poland

References

Sources 
 Elżbieta Charazińska, Ogród Saski, Warszawa, 1979, s. 13.

1697 births
1750 deaths
German Baroque architects
Architects from Warsaw
Rococo architects